The 2010–11 Ugandan Super League was the 44th season of the official Ugandan football championship, the top-level football league of Uganda.

Overview
The 2010–11 Uganda Super League was contested by 14 teams and was won by Uganda Revenue Authority SC, while Fire Masters and Gulu United FC were relegated.

League standings

Leading goalscorer
The top goalscorer in the 2010-11 season was Diego Hamis Kiiza of Uganda Revenue Authority SC with 14 goals.

Footnotes

External links
 Uganda - List of Champions - RSSSF (Hans Schöggl)
 Ugandan Football League Tables - League321.com
 Uganda Super League 2011/12 - Soccerway
 Uganda Super League 2010/11 - Futaa
 Uganda Super League 2010/11 - SoccerVista
 Uganda Super League 2010/11 - TablesLeague

Ugandan Super League seasons
Uganda Super League
Super League